Cerberus (also known as Cerberus: The Guardian of Hell), is a 2005 Sci Fi Channel original film, starring Sebastian Spence, Emmanuelle Vaugier, and Greg Evigan. The film was directed by John Terlesky, and was released direct–to–video in 2005.

Plot
Marcus Cutter and a bunch of mercenaries steal Attila the Hun's breastplate from a museum in Bucharest, Romania. They kill the curator Professor Radu before they escape by helicopter.

Meanwhile, Samantha Gaines, Professor Radu's best student, organises an exhibition in New York City. While she awaits the breastplate, her brother Zach is abducted because Cutter and his men need her support. The breastplate is presumed to lead to a legendary Sword of Mars, which makes its owner invincible. Samantha deciphers the inscriptions and finds where the item is hidden. Unfortunately the three–headed dog Cerberus who protects it is more than a legend.

Once Cutter gets his hands on the sword itself he kills everybody who gets in his way, including former Korean general Kul Jae Sung, who originally paid him to deliver the weapon. Samantha has to tackle the momentarily invincible Cutter and the actually immortal beast Cerberus at the same time.

Cast
 Sebastian Spence as Jake Addams
 Emmanuelle Vaugier as Dr. Samantha Gaines
 Greg Evigan as Marcus Cutter
 Garret Sato as Kul Jae Sung
 Brent Florence as Zach Gaines
 Michael Cory Davis as Burke
 K.B. Nau as Knipstrom
 Chuck Caudill Jr. as Reinholdt
 Bogdan Uritescu as Max
 Gelu Nitu as Professor Radu, The Curator
 Catalin Paraschiv as Dorsey
 Gabi Andronache as Attila the Hun
 John Terlesky as Willis (uncredited)

Reception
Christopher Armstead judged the film as not being "all that bad".

References

External links

2005 horror films
2000s science fiction horror films
2005 television films
Syfy original films
2005 films
CineTel Films films
2000s monster movies
American monster movies
Cultural depictions of Attila the Hun
Films about dogs
American sword and sorcery films
Films directed by John Terlesky
2000s American films